Jerald Christopher Jackson (born November 17, 1995) is an American football cornerback for the Los Angeles Chargers of the National Football League (NFL). He played college football at the University of Maryland and signed with the New England Patriots as an undrafted free agent in 2018. Jackson earned Pro Bowl honors during the 2021 season and was part of the Patriots team that won a Super Bowl title in Super Bowl LIII. After his rookie contract expired in 2022, he joined the Chargers.

Early years
Jackson attended Immokalee High School and played high school football there.
He was a four-star recruit coming out of high school and ranked as the 20th-best wide receiver in the class of 2014 by 247Sports. He committed to play football at the University of Florida.

College career

Florida
Jackson began his college career with the Florida Gators, but injured his shoulder in the opening game and did not play for the rest of the season. He was able to use this as a redshirt year. After being acquitted on an armed robbery charge, he did not return to Florida.

Riverside CC
Following his acquittal, Jackson left Florida and transferred to Riverside City College.

Maryland
While Jackson was a student at Riverside, college teams including the Michigan Wolverines and Penn State Nittany Lions expressed an interest in recruiting him. He began practicing with the Maryland Terrapins in April 2016 and transferred there for the 2016 season. After the 2017 season, Jackson announced he was forgoing his senior season and declaring for the 2018 NFL Draft.

Professional career

New England Patriots

2018
On May 11, 2018, the New England Patriots signed Jackson to a three-year, $1.72 million contract that includes a signing bonus of $10,000.

After a stellar training camp and preseason performance, Jackson was named to the Patriots' Week 1 53-man roster. In a Week 4 victory over the Miami Dolphins, Jackson recorded the first interception of his career on a throw from Ryan Tannehill. He recorded his second during a Week 7 road win over the Chicago Bears. He recorded his first career start during a Week 13 victory over the Minnesota Vikings, playing in 54 of the team's 61 defensive snaps. Jackson finished the 2018 season with 24 tackles, 6 passes defended, and 3 interceptions. Jackson helped the Patriots reach Super Bowl LIII, where they defeated the Los Angeles Rams 13–3. In practices Jackson moonlighted as a receiver playing for the scout team.

2019

In 2019, Jackson again made the Patriots' 53-man roster. In week 4 against the Buffalo Bills, Jackson intercepted quarterback Josh Allen twice and blocked a punt which was recovered by teammate Matthew Slater for a touchdown in the 16–10 win.
In week 14 against the Kansas City Chiefs, Jackson recorded his third interception of the season off a pass thrown by Patrick Mahomes during the 23–16 loss. In the Patriots' 34–13 win over the Cincinnati Bengals, Jackson intercepted quarterback Andy Dalton twice. All of Jackson's career interceptions to date have come on pass attempts of at least 15 yards.

2020
In Week 1 playing in a game against the Miami Dolphins, Jackson recorded his first interception of the season off a pass thrown by Ryan Fitzpatrick late in the fourth quarter to secure a 21–11 Patriots' win.
In Week 6 against the Denver Broncos, Jackson intercepted a pass thrown by Drew Lock during the 18–12 loss. In Week 7 against the San Francisco 49ers, Jackson recorded another interception, this time off a pass thrown by Jimmy Garoppolo, during the 33–6 loss. In Week 8 against the Buffalo Bills, Jackson recorded an interception off a pass thrown by Josh Allen during the 24–21 loss. This was Jackson's third interception in three games.
In Week 9 against the New York Jets, Jackson recorded another interception off a pass thrown by Joe Flacco in the fourth quarter after allowing two long touchdown passes from Flacco to wide receiver Breshad Perriman earlier in the game during the 30–27 win. In Week 10 against the Baltimore Ravens, Jackson recorded another interception from Lamar Jackson, setting a new franchise record for games in a row with an interception with five. This interception prevented the Ravens from scoring to end the first half and helped the Patriots earn a 23–17 upset victory. In Week 17 against the Jets, Jackson recorded his 9th interception of the season off a pass thrown by Sam Darnold during the 28–14 win.

2021
On March 17, 2021, Jackson received a second-round restricted free agent tender worth $3.384 million from the Patriots. He signed a one-year contract on April 16.

Jackson finished the season with 8 interceptions, including his first career pick six, and a league-leading 23 pass deflections. He was selected for the Pro Bowl, along with teammates Matthew Judon and Matthew Slater. He was also named a second-team All-Pro.

Los Angeles Chargers
On March 16, 2022, Jackson signed a five-year, $82.5 million contract with the Los Angeles Chargers. In August, he underwent ankle surgery, which forced him to miss the preseason and the season opener against the Las Vegas Raiders. He made his Chargers debut the following week in a 27–24 loss to the Kansas City Chiefs.

Jackson struggled while playing for the Chargers, leading to him being benched for Michael Davis in the Week 6 Monday Night Football matchup with the Denver Broncos. He returned the following week against the Seattle Seahawks, but suffered a non-contact patellar tendon rupture that ended his season.

NFL career statistics

Regular season

Postseason

Personal life
On April 18, 2015, Jackson was arrested in connection with an armed robbery. He was later formally charged with three counts of home invasion with a deadly weapon and one count of burglary of an occupied dwelling. On November 14, 2015, Jackson was found not guilty of all charges.

County commissioners in Jackson's home county of Collier County, Florida, declared April 9, 2019, "J. C. Jackson Day" in his honor.

References

External links
 New England Patriots profile
 Maryland profile

1995 births
Living people
American football cornerbacks
Florida Gators football players
Maryland Terrapins football players
New England Patriots players
People from Immokalee, Florida
Players of American football from Florida
American Conference Pro Bowl players
Los Angeles Chargers players